Paris Châtillon XIII are a French Rugby league club based in Châtillon, Hauts-de-Seine in the Île-de-France region. The club plays in the Île-de-France Regional league of the French National Division 2.

History 

Paris Chatillon XIII were founded in 1970 and from the 1980s onwards spent most of their time in the second tier National League 1 nowadays called the Elite Two Championship. In season 84/85 they reached the final and beat Pia XIII 18-12. They had to wait until season 2001/02 before they reached the final again but this time they lost out to Lyon Villeurbanne XIII 22-28. Since then the club have slowly drifted down the leagues and by 2010 they were in the 4th tier where they currently still are.

Club honours 

 Elite Two Championship (National League 1) (1): 1984-85

See also 

National Division 2

External links 

 Website

References 

French rugby league teams
Sports clubs in Paris
1970 establishments in France
Rugby clubs established in 1970